Henry Ogden may refer to:

 Henry Alexander Ogden (1856–1936), American illustrator
 Henry Warren Ogden (1842–1905), U.S. Representative from Louisiana

See also
 Harry Ogden (1924–1980), English rugby league footballer